Francesco Stefani (born 17 April 1971 in Bassano del Grappa) is an Italian slalom canoeist who competed from the late 1980s to the mid-2000s. He won a bronze medal in the C-1 team event at the 1993 ICF Canoe Slalom World Championships in Mezzana.

Stefani also finished 26th in the C-1 event at the 1996 Summer Olympics in Atlanta.

References

1971 births
Canoeists at the 1996 Summer Olympics
Italian male canoeists
Living people
Olympic canoeists of Italy
Medalists at the ICF Canoe Slalom World Championships
20th-century Italian people